Shaun McDonald (born 9 February 1989 in Goodwood, South Africa) is a South African rugby union player who last played for the  in the Currie Cup and in the Rugby Challenge. His regular position is lock or flanker.

Career

Youth, Varsity Cup and amateur rugby

While playing rugby for Tygerberg High School, McDonald was selected in 's Under-18 Craven Week squad for the 2006 edition in Johannesburg and earned a selection for the same side for the 2007 competition in Stellenbosch.

In 2009, he joined the Johannesburg-based  team. He made six appearances for them during the 2010 Under-21 Provincial Championship, playing six matches.

However, he failed to break into the senior side and he returned to Cape Town. He played club rugby for the  second team, Victorians He was named in the Maties squad for the 2012 Varsity Cup, but didn't make any appearances for them. He made just two appearances, but returned for the 2014 Varsity Cup, where he played in nine matches for Ikeys during the competition, scoring five tries as he helped the side reach the final. McDonald featured in the final against  in Potchefstroom, where UCT fought back from 33 to 15 down with five minutes to go to score a sensational 39–33 victory. He was also named the "Forward That Rocks" for the competition.

Eastern Province Kings

He started two more matches, but could not help his side achieve a victory in any of these matches, eventually finishing bottom of the log. He signed a two-year contract extension to remain in Port Elizabeth until the end of 2016.

Boland Cavaliers

He joined Wellington-based side  for the 2016 Currie Cup qualification series.

Griquas

He moved to Kimberley during 2016 to join .

References

South African rugby union players
Living people
1989 births
Rugby union players from Cape Town
Rugby union locks
Rugby union flankers
Eastern Province Elephants players